The men's long jump at the 2011 IPC Athletics World Championships is held at the QEII Stadium on 22-23, 25-26 and 29 January

Medalists

F11

F13

F20

F36

F37/38

F42
The Men's long jump, F42 was held on January 22

F42 = single above knee amputation or equivalent impairment.

Results

Final

Key:  CR = Championship Record, AR = Asian Record

F44

F46

See also
2011 IPC Athletics World Championships – Men's pentathlon
List of IPC world records in athletics

References
General
Complete Results Book from the 2011 IPC Athletics World Championships
Schedule and results, Official site of the 2011 IPC Athletics World Championships
IPC Athletics Classification Explained, Scottish Disability Sport
Specific

Long jump
Long jump at the World Para Athletics Championships